Chishma (Şişmä) is a rural locality (a village) in Sultanmuratovsky Selsoviet, Aurgazinsky District, Bashkortostan, Russia. The population was 96 as of 2010.

Geography 
It is located 12 km from Tolbazy and 3 km from Sultanmuratovo.

References 

Rural localities in Aurgazinsky District